Malaba is a village in Nyanga Province, Gabon.

References

Populated places in Nyanga Province